Coesfeld (Westphalian: Koosfeld) is the capital of the district of Coesfeld in the German state of North Rhine-Westphalia.

History

Coesfeld received its city rights in 1197, but was first recorded earlier than that in the biography of St. Ludger, patron and first bishop of the diocese of Munster who was born north of Coesfeld in Billerbeck. The day before he died, Ludger spent the night in Coesfeld and heard mass in the morning in the church he founded. He was on his way from his abbey in Essen to Münster. The road he followed passed Coesfeld and Billerbeck, and after preaching in the St. Lambert's church, 26 March 809, he travelled on to Billerbeck, where he died in the evening.

The Coesfeld St. Jacobikirche dates from the same period as the city charter. For centuries, Coesfeld was an important stopping place for pilgrims traveling one of the more popular Germanic Jakobi routes (Way of St. James) leading from Warendorf over Münster (via Billerbeck) to Coesfeld, and then on via Borken to Wesel on the Rhine.

Bernhard von Galen
During the Thirty Years' War, troops were stationed in Coesfeld. The Prince-bishop of Münster was often at odds with these troops. Bernhard von Galen managed to drive the foreign troops away and even started to build a palace in Coesfeld, but it was never finished and after he died it was torn down. He became known for his sieges of Dutch cities in his efforts for the counter reformation and started a Way of the Cross procession that still exists up to the present day, with 18 stations of the cross. One procession round the historic centre of Coesfeld is still held on Whitmonday but the "Great Procession along the stations of the cross" held for centuries on Whit Tuesday is now held on 9/14 (Exaltation of the Cross) if it is a Sunday otherwise on the Sunday thereafter.

Geography

Coesfeld is situated in the Baumberge in Münsterland.

Neighbouring municipalities
 Dülmen
 Havixbeck
 Billerbeck
 Nottuln
 Senden

Divisions
Coesfeld consists of 2 subdivisions:
 Coesfeld
 Lette

Education
Major secondary schools are:
 the Nepomucenum, 
 the Heriburg-Gymnasium 
 and the St.-Pius-Gymnasium.

Twin towns – sister cities

Coesfeld is twinned with:
 De Bilt, Netherlands
 Plerguer, France

Notable people

Leunclavius (1541–1594), humanist, legal scholar, Greek scholar and historian
Christoph Bernhard von Galen (1606–1678), Bishop of Münster, Coesfeld built from a bishopric
Anne Catherine Emmerich (1774–1824), Roman Catholic nun, visionary and stigmatic
Otto Bräutigam (1895–1992), lawyer and diplomat, took part in the Holocaust
Rudolf Wolters (1903–1983), architect and urban planner, close associate of Albert Speer
Hermann Wedekind (1910–1998), artistic director
Michael Oenning (born 1965), football player and coach

References

External links

 

 
Towns in North Rhine-Westphalia
Coesfeld (district)
Members of the Hanseatic League